The Fokker XB-8 was a bomber built for the United States Army Air Corps in the 1930s, derived from the high-speed Fokker O-27 observation aircraft.

Design and development
During assembly, the second prototype XO-27 was converted to a bomber prototype, dubbed the XB-8. While the XB-8 was much faster than existing biplane bombers, it did not have the bomb capacity to be considered for production. Two YB-8s and 4 Y1B-8s were ordered, but these were changed mid-production to Y1O-27 configuration.

The wing of the XB-8 and XO-27 was built entirely from wood, although the fuselage was constructed of steel tubes covered with fabric with the exception of the nose which had a corrugated metal. They featured the first retractable landing gear ever fitted to an Army Air Corps bomber or observation craft. The undercarriage retracted electrically. Crew was three in tandem position.

Operational history
It competed against the Douglas Y1B-7/XO-36. Both promised to greatly exceed the performance of the large biplane bombers then used by the Army Air Corps. However, the Douglas XB-7 was markedly better in performance than the XB-8, and no further versions of Fokker's aircraft were built.

Operators

United States Army Air Corps

Specifications (XB-8)

See also

References

Notes

Bibliography

 Pelletier, Alain J. "Fokker Twilight". Air Enthusiast, No. 117, May/June 2005, pp. 62–66. ISSN 0143-5450.
 Wagner, Ray. American Combat Planes. New York: Doubleday, 1982. .

External links

 O-27 USAAS 1000 Aircraft Photos
 Army's Mystery Plane Passes Speed Test – ''Popular Science
 Atlantic (Fokker) XB-8 – National Museum of the US Air Force

B-8
Fokker B-08
Mid-wing aircraft
Twin piston-engined tractor aircraft